Lee Feigon is an American historian who specialized in the study of 20th-century Chinese history.

In 2002 he published Mao: A Reinterpretation, a work of historical revisionism that sought to highlight what Feigon saw as the positive aspects of Mao Zedong's political leadership. He subsequently used that book as a basis for a documentary, The Passion of the Mao.

He has written for such U.S. publications as The Wall Street Journal, Barron's, The Nation, The Chicago Tribune, The Atlantic, and The Boston Globe.

Publications 
 Books

External links
Entry at The Huffington Post.
Entry at The Council of Independent Colleges

American biographers
American male biographers
University of California, Berkeley alumni
University of Chicago alumni
University of Wisconsin–Madison alumni
Year of birth missing (living people)
Living people
Historians of China